In economics, the new international division of labour (NIDL) is an outcome of globalization. The term was coined by theorists seeking to explain the spatial shift of manufacturing industries from advanced capitalist countries to developing countries—an ongoing geographic reorganisation of production, which finds its origins in ideas about a global division of labor. It is a spatial division of labor which occurs when the process of production is no longer confined to national economies. Under the "old" international division of labor, until around 1970, underdeveloped areas were incorporated into the world economy principally as suppliers of minerals and agricultural commodities. However, as developing economies are merged into the world economy, more production takes place in these economies.
 
This has led to a trend of transference, or what is also known as the "global industrial shift", in which production processes are relocated from developed countries (such as the US, European countries, and Japan) to developing countries in Asia (such as China, Vietnam, and India), Mexico and Central America. This is because companies search for the cheapest locations to manufacture and assemble components, so low-cost labor-intensive parts of the manufacturing process are shifted to the developing world where costs are substantially lower. Companies do so by taking advantage of transportation and communications technology, as well as fragmentation and locational flexibility of production. From 1953 to the late 1990s, the industrialised economies' share of world manufacturing output declined from 95% to 77%, and the developing economies' share more than quadrupled from 5% to 23%.

The resultant division of labor across continents closely follows the North–South socio-economic and political divide, where in the North—with one quarter of the world population—controls four fifths of the world income, while the South—with three quarters of the world population—has access to one fifth of the world income.

A summary

The NIDL is a spatial division of labor due to cut ties with national economies. Underdeveloped economies used to be incorporated with the world economy as suppliers of minerals and agricultural commodities. It has since added more production to these types of economies. With this, a "global industrial shift" occurs, meaning that production processes are relocated from developed countries to developing countries. Companies need a low cost location in order to manufacture and assemble products. Developing countries are able to produce at substantially lower prices than a developed country would.

In the NIDL, the north controls about 3/5 of the world's income while the south controls about 1/5.

See also
 Global workforce
 International relations
 South–South cooperation

References

Global workforce
Global inequality